John 'Jack' Saunders (born in the 1800s) was an English cricketer.  Saunders was a left-handed batsman.

Saunders made his first-class debut for Middlesex against Somerset in the 1891 County Championship.  He played a further first-class match in that season against Kent.  In his 2 matches he scored 16 runs at a batting average of 8.00, with a high score of 7*.

He made his debut for Buckinghamshire in the 1895 Minor Counties Championship against Oxfordshire.  He played Minor counties cricket for Buckinghamshire from 1895 to 1900, which included 44 Minor Counties Championship matches.

References

External links
Jack Saunders at ESPNcricinfo
Jack Saunders at CricketArchive

English cricketers
Middlesex cricketers
Buckinghamshire cricketers
19th-century English people
Year of death missing
1800 births